Karl Åke Torsten Gustafsson (1908–1988) was a Swedish botanist and geneticist, who was also known as an essayist and poet.

In 1949 he was elected a member of the Royal Swedish Academy of Agriculture and in 1966 a member of the Royal Swedish Academy of Sciences.

References

1908 births
1988 deaths
20th-century Swedish botanists
Swedish geneticists
Academic staff of Lund University
Members of the Royal Swedish Academy of Sciences
Foreign associates of the National Academy of Sciences